Gabriela Dabrowski was the defending champion, but decided not to participate this year.

Tatjana Maria won the title, defeating Jovana Jakšić 6–3, 6–2 in the final.

Seeds

Draw

Finals

Top half

Bottom half

References
Main Draw

Tevlin Women's Challenger
Tevlin Women's Challenger